Muzimes collaris is a species of blister beetles belonging to the family Meloidae. It is present in Bulgaria, Greece, Malta, North Macedonia, Republic of Moldova, Romania, Southern Russia and the Near East.

References

Meloidae
Beetles of Europe
Beetles described in 1787